Stárkov is a town in Náchod District in the Hradec Králové Region of the Czech Republic. It has about 600 inhabitants. The town centre is well preserved and is protected by law as an urban monument zone.

Administrative parts

Villages of Bystré, Chlívce, Horní Dřevíč and Vápenka are administrative parts of Stárkov.

Geography
It lies in the Broumov Highlands, in the Broumovsko Protected Landscape Area. The Dřevíč Stream flows through the town.

History
The first written mention of Stárkov is from 1250. It was probably founded in the first half of the 13th century during the colonization of forests in this region. The name Stárkov was first used in 1321. In 1573, Stárkov was promoted to a town.

Sights
The town hall is the main representative building of Stárkov and the landmark of the town square. The very first town hall is documented in 1575. The current town hall was built in 1854. The Baroque castle with gardens was originally built in 1546 and rebuilt in 1681–1691. Other sights on the square include historical houses, Classicist fountain and Marian column from 1726.

The Church of Saint Joseph was built in 1654–1662 and replaced an old church destroyed by a fire. The tower was added in 1765. The rectory from 1575 was restored in 1660. There is the Chapel of Fourteen Holy Helpers on a hill above the town. The way from the church to the chapel is lined with Stations of the Cross.

References

External links

Cities and towns in the Czech Republic
Populated places in Náchod District